Metaemene is a genus of moths of the family Erebidae. The genus was erected by George Hampson in 1910.

Taxonomy
The genus has previously been classified in the subfamily Acontiinae of the family Noctuidae.

Species
Metaemene atrigutta (Walker, 1862)
Metaemene atropunctata (Pagenstecher, 1896)
Metaemene baliochraspedus Rothschild, 1920
Metaemene hampsoni Wileman, 1914
Metaemene karenkonis (Matsumura, 1930)

References

External links

Boletobiinae
Noctuoidea genera